Dufferin—Caledon is a provincial electoral district in southwestern Ontario, Canada. It was created for the 2007 provincial election. The entire riding was carved from Dufferin—Peel—Wellington—Grey, and includes all of Dufferin County plus the town of Caledon in Peel Region.

The riding also existed from 1987 until 1999 with the same borders, but was known as Dufferin—Peel.

Members of Provincial Parliament

Election results

Dufferin—Peel—Wellington—Grey

Dufferin—Peel

2007 electoral reform referendum

Sources

Elections Ontario Past Election Results
Map of riding for 2018 election

Ontario provincial electoral districts
Caledon, Ontario
Orangeville, Ontario